Fabian Ajogwu, SAN, FCIArb, is a Senior Advocate of Nigeria and the Founding Partner of Kenna Partners. He has well over two decades of law practice experience in the field of Foreign Direct Investments and Corporate Restructuring in the Financial Services Sector, and Natural Resources Sector; including Litigation and Arbitration in related fields. He is an alumnus of the Said Business School of Oxford University and an alumnus of the Lagos Business School in Nigeria where he lectures and has taught courses on Business Law and Negotiations over the past 15 years.

Early years
Fabian Ikenna Ajogwu, SAN, FCIArb was born on 23 June 1970 at the end of the civil war to Dr Michael Ajogwu, SAN and Mrs. Caroline Ajogwu. His father, a Senior Advocate of Nigeria (Q.C Equivalent) of repute in Nigeria was once the Attorney General of Enugu State; and his mother was a School Principal. He had his formative education in St. Louis School, Kano, and proceeded to the Federal Government College, Kano for his secondary education. He obtained his law degree from the University of Nigeria, Nsukka, and a master's degree in Law from the University of Lagos.

He also holds a Doctor of Philosophy (Law) degree from the University of Aberdeen, Scotland and a Masters in Business Administration (MBA) from IESE Business School, University of Navarra, Barcelona, Spain.
Taking Silk at the age of 39, Ajogwu has numerous landmark cases to his credit.

Career
As the Principal Partner at Kenna Partners, Ajogwu specializes in advising and representing major multinational corporations in diverse areas of law especially Energy & Natural Resources, Arbitration and Litigation, Admiralty and Maritime, Banking, Investments and Corporate Finance and Corporate Governance.

He assisted in drafting Nigeria's pioneer Code of Corporate Governance for the Securities and Exchange Commission in 2003. In 2005, he founded the Society for Corporate Governance Nigeria (SCGN), a registered non-profit committed to the development of corporate governance best practices and ethics. SCGN works with the active support of the International Finance Corporation, World Bank, the Securities and Exchange Commission, the Nigerian Stock Exchange and leading listed companies in Nigeria. He also chaired the Nigerian Communications Commission Committee on Corporate Governance that produced the 2014 NCC Code of Corporate Governance for the Telecommunication Sector.

The Learned Silk has been Lead Counsel to the Federal Government of Nigeria in several cases of national importance with emphasis in aviation, defence, energy, and financial services sectors.  He serves on various boards and chairs Novare companies in Nigeria, ARM Harith Infrastructure Ltd (Nigeria's pioneer infrastructure fund) amongst others. He has served as Honorary Counsel to the State of Israel in Nigeria, Venezuela and Republic of South Africa in Nigeria. 

Ajogwu is a Fellow of the Society for Corporate Governance Nigeria; a Fellow of the Nigerian Institute of Chartered Arbitrators, https://guardian.ng/appointments/prof-fabian-ajogwu-san-elected-president-of-the-nigerian-institute-of-chartered-arbitrators/Fellow of the African Leadership Initiative West Africa, Henry Crown Global Leadership of the Aspen Institute and a Fellow of the AIFA Reading Society. He serves on the board of the Lagos Court of Arbitration as its Vice-President. He is a member of the General Council of the Bar, and the Council of Legal Education (Nigerian Law School).https://blog.nicarb.org/index.php/2021/10/07/prof-fabian-ajogwu-san-elected-president-of-the-nigerian-institute-of-chartered-arbitrators/ He also served as a member of the Governing Council of Pan-Atlantic University up until 2018.

As an accomplished author, he has written several books such as ‘The Law & Practice of Private Equity'; ‘Ship Acquisition & Finance: Law & Practice'; 'Corporate Governance & Group Dynamics'; 'Corporate Governance in Nigeria: Law and Practice'; 'Commercial Arbitration in Nigeria: Law and Practice'; 'Fair Hearing'; 'Mergers & Acquisition in Nigeria: Law and Practice'; 'Law and Society'. He is the co-author of the books – 'Outcomes-Based Governance: Modern Perspectives to Corporate Governance' with Professor Mervyn King SC; 'Petroleum Law and Sustainable Development' with Dr Oscar Nliam; 'Legal & Regulatory Aspects of Commerce' with Kenna Partners; and 'Trade & Investments in Nigeria: Legal and Regulatory Aspects' with Kenna Partners; 'Oral and Written Advocacy: Law & Practice' with Chief Folake Solanke, SAN; and 'Collecting Art: A Handbook' with Dr Jess Castellote.https://fabianajogwufoundation.org/

Awards, honours and fellowships
Ajogwu is a Senior Advocate of Nigeria, a recipient of Hon. Justice Kayode Eso Award for Excellence, Nigerian Institute of Arbitrators. https://www.thisdaylive.com/index.php/2022/02/27/michael-ajogwu-a-senior-advocate-par-excellence/He is a fellow, African Leadership Initiative West Africa, Henry Crown Global Leadership Fellowship, Aspen Institute Fellow, Fellow, Chartered Institute of Arbitrators Nigeria, Fellow, Center for Commercial Law Development, Nigeria, Fellow, Society for Corporate Governance Nigeria.

He was the Chairman, Committee on Continuing Legal Education, Nigerian Bar Association, Lagos, and member of the followings; London Court of International Arbitration, London, Legal Research Society, School of Law, University of Aberdeen, Nigerian Institute of Management and Nigerian Society for International Law. He is also a member of the Council of Legal Education.https://esut.edu.ng/administration/professor-fabian-ajogwu/

Selected publications and works
 Ajogwu, Fabian (2020), The Law & Practice of Private Equity, Thomson Reuters, London, UK
 Ajogwu, Fabian and King, Mervyn, (2020), Outcomes-Based Governance: A Modern Approach to Corporate Governance, Juta Ltd, Cape Town, South Africa, 224 pages  
 Ajogwu, Fabian (2019), Commercial Arbitration in Nigeria: Law and Practice, 3rd Edition, Thomson Reuters (Legal), Pamplona, Spain, 668 pages
 Ajogwu, Fabian (2019), Decoupling Ownership from Management of Companies: Governance Perspectives in the Pursuit of Profits, 3rd Edition, Ceenai Publishers Ltd, Lagos, Nigeria, 74 pages
Ajogwu, Fabian (2018), Ship Acquisition & Finance: Law & Practice, Thomson Reuters (Legal), Pamplona, Spain,255 pages
 Ajogwu, Fabian and Jess Castellote (2017), Collecting Art A Handbook (Book Craft), Lagos, Nigeria, 285 pages
 Ajogwu, Fabian (2017), Ship Acquisition & Finance: Law & Practice, Commercial Law Development Services (CLDS), Lagos, Nigeria, 255 pages
 Solanke, Folake and Ajogwu, Fabian, (2016), Oral & Written Advocacy: Law & Practice, Commercial Law Development Services (CLDS), Lagos, Nigeria, 302 pages
 Ajogwu, Fabian and Kenna Partners, (2015), Trade & Investments in Nigeria: Legal & Regulatory Aspects, Commercial Law Development Services (CLDS), Lagos, Nigeria, 436 pages
 Ajogwu, et al., (2015), Company Secretary's Guide on Corporate Governance, Commercial Law Development Services (CLDS), Lagos, Nigeria, 329 pages
 Ajogwu, et al., (2014), Directors Handbook on Corporate Governance, Commercial Law Development Services (CLDS), Lagos, Nigeria, 257 pages
 Ajogwu, Fabian (2014), Mergers & Acquisition in Nigeria: Law and Practice, 2nd Edition, . Eds. Center for Commercial Law Development Services (CLDS), Lagos, Nigeria, 554 pages
 Ajogwu, Fabian and Nliam, Oscar, (2014), Petroleum Law & Sustainable Development, Centre for Commercial Law Development (CCLD), Lagos, Nigeria, 445 pages,
 Ajogwu, Fabian (2013), Law & Society, Center for Commercial Law Development (CCLD), Lagos, Nigeria, 326 pages, 
 Ajogwu, Fabian (2013), Corporate Governance and Group Dynamics,  Center for Commercial Law Development (CCLD), Lagos, Nigeria, 420 pages
 Ajogwu, Fabian (2013), Commercial Arbitration in Nigeria: Law and Practice, 2nd Edition, 978-978-919-957-0 Eds. Center for Commercial Law Development (CCLD), Lagos, Nigeria, 656 pages
 Ajogwu, Fabian (2010), Fair Hearing, . Eds. Center for Commercial Law Development (CCLD), Lagos, Nigeria, 166 pages.
 Ajogwu, Fabian (2009), Mergers & Acquisition in Nigeria: Law and Practice, . Eds. Center for Commercial Law Development (CCLD), Lagos, Nigeria, 925 pages
 Ajogwu, Fabian (2009), Commercial Arbitration in Nigeria: Law and Practice, . Eds. Center for Commercial Law Development (CCLD), Lagos, Nigeria, 544 pages
 Ajogwu, Fabian (2007), Corporate Governance in Nigeria: Law and Practice,   Eds. Center for Commercial Law Development (CCLD), Lagos, Nigeria, 491 pages

Selected articles
 Notable among his articles includes "Making Boards More Effective," published in 2001 in the Lagos Business School Management Review, Vol. 6 No. 1, pp 38 – 46, "Multi Jurisdictional Compliance in Cyberspace" published in 2002 by the European Case Clearing House (ECCH), Cranfield University, UK, Issue No. 28 Spring, pp 14 – 16. "Dispute Handling and Litigation Management," published in the Journal of the Chartered Institute of Arbitrators Nigeria, ISSN. 2006-957X, Vol. 3, No. 1, pp 44 – 48.
 His 2009 work includes "Steps in Formal Mediation and Conciliation" in The Journal of the Chartered Institute of Arbitrators Nigeria, ISSN. 2006-957X; Vol. 4, No. 1, pp 54 – 68, Stay of Proceedings in Arbitration: The Distinction between a Step to Preserve the Res, and a Step in the Proceedings, in the Journal of the Chartered Institute of Arbitrators Nigeria, ISSN. 2006-957X; Vol. 4, No. 1, pp 14 – 35, Enhancing Board Effectiveness through Committees, in the Journal of Corporate Governance, Vol.1 No. 1, pp 1 – 16 and "Corporate Control and Pursuit of Profit: from Agency Theory to Modern Corporate Governance", published in the Journal of Corporate Governance, ISSN. 2006–7801, Vol.1 No. 1, pp 187 – 207.
 In 2010, he wrote "Corporate Governance and Ethic in Nigeria: The Imperatives" published in the Journal of Corporate Governance, ISSN. 2006–7801, Vol.2 No. 1, pp 207–241 and "Corporate Acquisitions & Merger in Nigeria: Thresholds and Considerations", published in the Journal of Corporate Governance, ISSN. 2006–7801, Vol.2 No. 1, pp 290–320. in 2013, Ajogwu wrote "Opportunities and Pitfalls in Mergers & Acquisitions" in the Journal of Corporate Governance, ISSN. 2006–7801, Vol.4 No. 1, pp 517–540.
 In 2014, he submitted the article "Dealing with Guerrilla Tactics in International Arbitration: Which tools for Counsel and Arbitrators", to the Disputes Journal of the Lagos Court of Arbitration for publication.

References

External links
Kenna Partners
 Society for Corporate Governance Nigeria 
 Lagos Court of Arbitration 
 Pan-Atlantic University 
 My Legal Notes

1970 births
Living people
Igbo lawyers
Litigators
Arbitrators
University of Lagos alumni
University of Nigeria alumni
University of Navarra alumni
Alumni of the University of Aberdeen
Senior Advocates of Nigeria
Nigerian philanthropists
Nigerian expatriates in Spain
21st-century Nigerian businesspeople
Academic staff of Pan-Atlantic University
Igbo academics